Kim Suzanne Bridgford (August 8, 1959 – June 28, 2020) was an American poet, writer, critic, and academic. In her poetry, she wrote primarily in traditional forms, particularly sonnets. She was the director of Poetry by the Sea: A Global Conference, established in 2014 and first held in May 2015. She directed the West Chester University Poetry Conference from 2010-14.

As editor-in-chief at Mezzo Cammin, a journal of poetry by women, she founded The Mezzo Cammin Women Poets Timeline Project, which is designed to become the world's largest database of women poets. She was formerly the editor of Dogwood: A Journal of Poetry and Prose.

Life
Kim Bridgford was born in 1959. She grew up in Coal Valley, Illinois. She earned both her Bachelor of Arts and Master of Fine Arts degrees from the University of Iowa; the latter degree was earned from the Iowa Writers' Workshop. Bridgford earned her Ph.D. from the University of Illinois.

She started teaching at Fairfield University in Connecticut in 1989. In 1994, she moved to Wallingford, Connecticut with her husband, Peter Duval, an award-winning author of fiction. In 1996, their son, Nick, was born. In August 2010, she and her family moved to Philadelphia, where Bridgford joined the West Chester University faculty and served as director of the West Chester University Poetry Center.

Bridgford died from cancer on June 28, 2020, at the age of 60, at a hospice care center in Bettendorf, Iowa.

Awards and honors
In 1994, Bridgford was named Connecticut Professor of the Year by the Carnegie Foundation for the Advancement of Teaching. In 1999, she was awarded a National Endowment for the Arts fellowship in poetry. In 2003, she received a poetry fellowship from the Connecticut Commission on the Arts.

Bridgford was the 2007 Touring Poet for the Connecticut Poetry Circuit. That year, her book In the Extreme: Sonnets about World Records received the 2007 Donald Justice Poetry Award.

Books
2003 — Undone (WordTech Communications)
2005 — Instead of Maps (WordTech Communications, May 1, 2005), nominated for the Poets' Prize
2007 — In the Extreme: Sonnets about World Records (Contemporary Poetry Review Press), winner of Donald Justice Poetry Prize
2010 — Take-Out: Sonnets about Fortune Cookies (David Roberts Books; WordTech Communications)
2011 — Hitchcock's Coffin: Sonnets about Classic Films (David Roberts Books; WordTech Communications)
2012 — Bully Pulpit: Poems (White Violet Press)
2013 — Epiphanies: Poems (David Roberts Books; WordTech Communications)
2014 — Doll (Main Street Rag)
2016 — Human Interest (White Violet Press)
2019 — A Crown for Ted and Sylvia (Wipf and Stock)

In addition, Bridgford's poetry has appeared in The North American Review, The Christian Science Monitor, and The Iowa Review. While best known as a poet, she also wrote fiction which has appeared in The Georgia Review, The Massachusetts Review, and Redbook.

References

External links
Dogwood: A Journal of Poetry and Prose
Donald Justice Poetry Prize

1959 births
2020 deaths
20th-century American non-fiction writers
20th-century American poets
20th-century American women writers
21st-century American non-fiction writers
21st-century American poets
21st-century American women writers
Academics from Illinois
American academics of English literature
American women non-fiction writers
American women poets
Deaths from cancer in Iowa
Fairfield University faculty
Formalist poets
People from Coal Valley, Illinois
People from Wallingford, Connecticut
Poets from Illinois
Sonneteers
University of Illinois Urbana-Champaign alumni
University of Iowa alumni
West Chester University faculty
American women academics